Ship of Girls or Living Goods (German: Lebende Ware or  Das Mädchenschiff) is a 1929 Austrian-German silent drama film directed by Robert Wohlmuth and starring Margot Landa, Luigi Serventi and Attila Hörbiger. Its plot concerns white slavery.

Cast
 Margot Landa as Miss Europe
 Luigi Serventi as Charles Barrow
 Theodor Pištěk as Jack Brown
 Attila Hörbiger as RIII
 Eugen Neufeld as Prefect of Costo Roma
 El' Dura as Myrrha
 Paula Pfluger

References

Bibliography
 Gandert, Gero. 1929. Walter de Gruyter, 1993.

External links

1929 films
1929 drama films
German drama films
Austrian drama films
Films of the Weimar Republic
German silent feature films
Austrian silent feature films
Films directed by Robert Wohlmuth
Films about prostitution in Germany
German black-and-white films
Austrian black-and-white films
Silent drama films
1920s German films
1920s German-language films